Visvaldis George Nagobads (born November 18, 1921) is an American physician. He was born in Latvia, earned a medical degree from the University of Tübingen in Germany, then emigrated to the United States in 1951. He served 34 years as the team physician for Minnesota Golden Gophers men's ice hockey and was a part of three NCAA Division I championship teams. He also served as the physician for the US men's national team at five Winter Olympics and was on the Miracle on Ice team which won the gold medal at the 1980 Winter Olympics. His other work has included chief medical officer for USA Hockey, the medical committee for the International Ice Hockey Federation, and team physician for the Minnesota Fighting Saints and Minnesota North Stars. His career was recognized with the Paul Loicq Award for contributions to international hockey, induction into the Golden Gophers Hockey Hall of Fame, and induction into the United States Hockey Hall of Fame as an individual and as a member of the US men's national team.

Early life and education
Visvaldis George Nagobads was born on November 18, 1921, in Riga, Latvia. He played ice hockey and bandy as a youth in Latvia. While in high school, he chose to become a doctor and follow in his uncle's footsteps. His family fled to Germany due to the Soviet re-occupation of Latvia in 1944.

Nagobads studied at the University of Tübingen in Germany and earned his medical degree. After World War II, he worked on a mobile X-ray unit for an international refugee organization in France which assisted in diagnosis of tuberculosis. He had lunch one day with a Christian minister from Minnesota who recommended moving to the United States since employment in the medical field was easier to get. He and his wife moved to Minnesota in June 1951. He worked as a hospital orderly while he learned English, then completed his surgical residency, then began working for student health services at the University of Minnesota in 1956.

Minnesota ice hockey career

Nagobads was recommended for the university's ice hockey programs by Ruth Boynton, the director of student health service. He served as the team physician for Minnesota Golden Gophers men's ice hockey for 34 years from 1958 to 1992, and was a part of three NCAA Division I national championship teams. In an interview in 2008, Nagobads recalled that he enjoyed caring about the athletes and specialized in knee and shoulder injuries. He worked with several coaches for the Golden Gophers, including Herb Brooks, Glen Sonmor, Brad Buetow, and Doug Woog. Nagobads considered Brooks to be family and stated, "I really appreciated the way Herbie always treated the players, and for me, he was just like my son".

Nagobads was also the team physician for the Minnesota Fighting Saints in the World Hockey Association from 1973 to 1976, and the Minnesota North Stars in the National Hockey League from 1984 to 1992.

International ice hockey career
Nagobads served as the physician for the US men's national team at five Winter Olympics from 1968 to 1988, and at 15 other international tournaments from 1967 to 1990. He was also the physician for the US men's junior national team at five World Junior championships, and the US women's national team when it was established in 1990. He was the chief medical officer for USA Hockey from 1984 to 1992, and has sat on the Safety and Protective Equipment Committee for USA Hockey since 1984. He also served on the International Ice Hockey Federation (IIHF) Medical Committee from 1990 to 2010, and assisted with programs to eliminate doping in sport.

In advance of the ice hockey at the 1980 Winter Olympics, Nagobads suggested to Herb Brooks that Mike Eruzione be named the US men's national team captain due to his leadership skills. Nagobads also welcome goaltender Jim Craig into this house, who wanted to live with a family while the national team trained. The US men's national team won the Olympic gold medal in 1980, which included a 4–3 victory over the Soviet Union national team known as the Miracle on Ice. Brooks wanted his team to play on lines lasting 40 seconds or less to stay energized by the third period. Nagobads stood beside Brooks with a stopwatch tracking the ice time for the players, and later joked that he never saw the game since he was focused on the watch during the entire game. He skipped the post-game celebration to complete injury reports for the players, when he was approached by players on the Soviet team who asked for translation assistance to buy Moon Boots for their wives.

Nagobads published his memoirs of the US men's national team in his 2004 book, Gold, Bronze, & Silver: A Doctor's Devotion to American Hockey. In the 2004 film Miracle, actor Kenneth Welsh portrayed Nagobads in a story about the 1980 Winter Olympics team. In a 2010 interview, Nagobads stated that his fondest memories of hockey included the victory over the Soviet Union in 1980, and the subsequent gold medal victory in the final game versus the Finland national team.

Honors and legacy

Nagobads was known as the "hockey doc" during his 34-year tenure with the Minnesota Golden Gophers men's ice hockey team. He was made the namesake of the Dr. V. George Nagobads Unsung Hero Award in 1978, at the recommendation of Herb Brooks for annual recognition of a player on the team.

In 2003, the IIHF recognized his career of contributions to international ice hockey with the Paul Loicq Award. In the same year, he was inducted into the United States Hockey Hall of Fame as a member of the US men's national team at the 1980 Winter Olympics. USA Hockey honored him with both the Distinguished Achievement Award and the Excellence in Safety Award in 2005. In 2010, he was inducted into the United States Hockey Hall of Fame as an individual in the builder category.

Nagobads was inducted into the Golden Gophers Hockey Hall of Fame in 2010. In a men's hockey pre-game ceremony on November 20, 2021, the Golden Gophers celebrated the 100th birthday for Nagobads, and recognized the 1974, 1976 and 1979 NCAA hockey championships won by the Golden Gophers. He was named the recipient of the 2021–22 State of Hockey Legacy Award, in recognition of long-term contributions to hockey in Minnesota, as given by the Minnesota Wild in partnership with Minnesota Hockey and Bally Sports North.

Personal life
Nagobads speaks five languages: English, Latvian, Russian, German and French. He has two daughters, and resides in Edina, Minnesota. He was married to Velta Maria Nagobads until her death on September 12, 2005. She was interred in Crystal Lake Cemetery in Minneapolis. In April 2015, he was mugged while laying flowers and visiting his wife's grave. He escaped by throwing his wallet away, then drove himself to the hospital where he received 18 stitches on wounds to his head. In November 2015, Nagobads became an ambassador for the Kids First Fund and contributed to fostering safe environments for abused children worldwide. He turned 100 on November 18, 2021.

References

1921 births
Living people
1980 US Olympic ice hockey team
20th-century American physicians
American centenarians
American sports physicians
Ice hockey people from Minnesota
International Ice Hockey Federation executives
Latvian centenarians
Latvian emigrants to the United States
Latvian expatriates in Germany
Men centenarians
Minnesota Fighting Saints
Minnesota Golden Gophers ice hockey
Minnesota North Stars
Paul Loicq Award recipients
Physicians from Minnesota
Physicians from Riga
Sportspeople from Edina, Minnesota
Sportspeople from Riga
United States Hockey Hall of Fame inductees
University of Minnesota people
University of Tübingen alumni
USA Hockey personnel